The 2016 Nebraska–Kearney Lopers football team represented the University of Nebraska at Kearney in the 2016 NCAA Division II football season. The Lopers played their home games on Foster Field in Ron & Carol Cope Stadium in Kearney, Nebraska, as they have done since 1939. 2016 was the 111th season in school history. The Lopers were led by second-year head coach, Josh Lamberson. Nebraska–Kearney has been a member of the Mid-America Intercollegiate Athletics Association since 2012.

Preseason
The Lopers entered the 2016 season after finishing with a 0–11 record overall and in conference play, under Lamberson. On August 2, 2016, at the MIAA Football Media Day, the Lopers were chosen to finish in 11th place in the Coaches Poll and 12th place in the Media Poll.

Personnel

Coaching staff
Along with Lamberson, there were 13 assistants.

Roster

Schedule

Source:

Game summaries

Missouri Western

Emporia State

Northwest Missouri State

Washburn

Missouri Southern

Central Missouri

Central Oklahoma

Northeastern State

Lindenwood

Pittsburg State

Fort Hays State

References

Nebraska-Kearney
Nebraska–Kearney Lopers football seasons
Nebraska-Kearney Lopers footbal